Unstoppable is the upcoming fourth studio album and first posthumous non-compilation album from American singer Aaliyah. It was scheduled to be released in January 2022 through Blackground Records 2.0 and Empire, but did not come out at that time and as of 2023, a new release date has yet to be announced. The album was preceded by the single "Poison", which features vocals from Canadian singer the Weeknd. The album is the first studio album of Aaliyah material since her 2001 death.

Background
On August 25, 2021, the 20th anniversary of Aaliyah's death, her uncle and Blackground Records 2.0 label boss, Barry Hankerson, revealed in an interview with Big Tigger for WVEE that a fourth (and likely final) studio album, titled Unstoppable, would be released in "a matter of weeks". The album will feature Drake, Snoop Dogg, Ne-Yo, Chris Brown, Future and use previously unreleased vocals from before Aaliyah's death. Hankerson shared that this will be the end of new music for the late star and added, "I think it's wonderful. It's a very emotional process to do. It's very difficult to hear her sing when she's not here, but we got through it." Hankerson added in 2022, "She loved Snoop Dogg, who's done a great record in collaboration with Future. Ne-Yo gave us an excellent song; also Drake. Timbaland produced the track that Chris Brown did. It's vintage R&B with strong vocals."

Following the release of the first single, Hankerson told Billboard: "Everything I do at Blackground is always with Aaliyah in my heart and in my mind. God knows Aaliyah and I spent a lot of time talking about music. I think she would be very happy with the selections we made and the guests because the artists themselves made it known to us how much they wanted to work with her and be a part of her legacy. And I pray that she is happy. Aaliyah would love hearing herself with the current stars of the industry that she cared so much about. And that's all I wanted to do."

Singles
The lead single from the album, "Poison", which features Canadian singer-songwriter the Weeknd, was released on December 17, 2021. Aaliyah's vocals had been demoed in 2001, shortly before the singer's death. Upon release, the single attracted backlash due to the poor quality of Aaliyah's vocals in comparison to the crisp quality of the Weeknd's vocals. Fans of Aaliyah dismissed the song as "disrespectful". Less than twenty four hours after release, Mike Dean, who mixed and mastered the track, released an updated, and much clearer, version on all digital outlets. One week after the single's release, it debuted at number 33 on the New Zealand Hot Singles Chart. In the US, "Poison" debuted at number 26 on the Billboard Adult R&B Airplay Chart for the week of 1 January 2022. It peaked at number 21 and spent 12 weeks on that chart. "Poison" also debuted on the Billboard R&B Digital Song Sales at number 14.

References 

Aaliyah albums
Empire Distribution albums
Upcoming albums